Nicklas Halse (born 3 May 1997) is a Danish professional footballer who plays as a defensive midfielder for Danish 1st Division club Hvidovre IF. Halse has also represented Denmark at several youth levels.

Club career

Hvidovre IF
Halse was born in Hvidovre, the son of Karsten Halse, a former player of Brøndby IF. He started his career with Hvidovre IF, making his senior debut on 23 March 2014 as a 17-year-old as a starter against Silkeborg IF.

Brøndby IF
On 15 July 2014, Halse signed a two-year contract with Brøndby IF, initially joining the club's under-19 team. He made his professional debut in the Danish Superliga under head coach Auri Skarbalius on 13 March 2015, replacing Christian Nørgaard in the 83rd minute of a 1–0 home win over Randers FC. This would remain his only professional for Brøndby.

FC Roskilde
Halse joined Danish 1st Division club FC Roskilde on 22 July 2016, signing a short-term contract. After impressing and growing into a starter for the club, Halse signed a two-year extension on 26 October keeping him at Roskilde until 2018.

He played four seasons with Roskilde in the Danish second tier, making 122 total appearances in which he managed to score five goals. He left the club after Roskilde's relegation in the 2019–20 season.

Fjölnir
On 10 September 2020, Halse moved to Fjölnir who were bottom of the top level Úrvalsdeild. He made his Fjölnir debut four days later, starting in a 2–2 draw against Grótta. After five appearances, he left after the club's relegation in October 2020.

Return to Hvidovre IF
Halse returned to his boyhood club Hvidovre IF on 20 January 2021 on a one-and-a-half-year deal.

Personal life
Halse tore his anterior cruciate ligament in November 2021, sidelining him for an extended period. While missing time on the pitch, he began working in customer service for Nykredit.

Career statistics

Club

References

External links

1997 births
Living people
Danish men's footballers
Danish expatriate men's footballers
Denmark youth international footballers
Danish Superliga players
Danish 1st Division players
Hvidovre IF players
Brøndby IF players
FC Roskilde players
Nicklas Halse
Association football midfielders
Danish expatriate sportspeople in Iceland
Expatriate footballers in Iceland
People from Hvidovre Municipality
Sportspeople from the Capital Region of Denmark
Úrvalsdeild karla (football) players